Cecil James Sidney Woolf (1927–2019) was an English author and publisher.  He was a nephew of the Woolfs of the Bloomsbury Group and lived in Hammersmith and Mornington Crescent.  During the Second World War, he joined the Royal Tank Regiment, fought in Italy and rose to the rank of Captain.

Life
He was the son of Philip Woolf and his wife Barbara Lownds, brought up on the Rothschild Waddesdon estate where his father was the manager. He was educated at Stowe School, and then enlisted in the Royal Tank Regiment at the age of sixteen, fighting in the Italian campaign and rising to the rank of Captain. Leaving the army in 1947, he worked for Woolf, Christie stockbrokers and then became a bookseller.

Woolf was the husband of biographer Jean Moorcroft Wilson, who was general editor of the "War Poets" series of monographs that he published.  He was himself named after his father's brother, Cecil Nathan Sidney Woolf, who wrote poetry and was killed at Cambrai in the First World War.  His father had been wounded by the same shell which killed his namesake.

His writings include A Bibliography of Norman Douglas (Rupert Hart-Davis, 1954); A Bibliography of Frederick Rolfe Baron Corvo (Rupert Hart-Davis, 1957); The Clerk without a Benefice. A study of Fr. Rolfe, Baron Corvo's conversion and vocation (with Brocard Sewell; Aylesford: St. Albert's Press, 1964).

Woolf died on 10 June 2019, at the age of 92.

References

1927 births
2019 deaths
20th-century English businesspeople
English publishers (people)
People educated at The Dragon School
Royal Tank Regiment officers
People educated at Stowe School